Beautiful Sunday is a 2007 South Korean crime drama film.

Plot 
Police detective Kang has resorted to illegal activities to pay for the medical bills of his wife, who is in a coma. One day he is approached by a man named Min-woo, who confesses to killing his own wife. Kang realises that the murder and his wife's accident are in fact connected.

Cast 
 Park Yong-woo ... Detective Kang
 Namkoong Min ... Min-woo
 Min Ji-hye ... Soo-yeon
 Lee Ki-young ... Lee Gi-cheol
 Kim Dong-ha ... Jo Sang-tae
 Kim Eung-soo ... Criminal unit chief
 Oh Jung-se ... Yoo Chang-won
 Park Byung-eun ... Detective Min

References

External links 
 
 
 
 Beautiful Sunday review at Koreanfilm.org

South Korean crime drama films
2007 films
Showbox films
2007 crime drama films
2000s South Korean films